La Condition humaine is a French expression that has been used as the title for various works:

 La Condition humaine, a series of pictures by Rene Magritte
 A novel by Andre Malraux, translated as Man's Fate

See also

 Human condition (disambiguation)